Macará is a city in Ecuador.

Macara may also refer to:

Places
 Macará Canton, a canton of Ecuador
 Macará River, which forms part of the border between Ecuador and Peru

People
 Alexander MacAra (1932-2012), British epidemiologist
 Robert Macara (1759–1815), British Army officer of the Napoleonic War era
 Macara baronets
 Nigel Macara, Australian musician, member of Ariel

Other
 Macara (moth), a genus of moth
 Club Social y Deportivo Macará, an Ecuadorian association football team

See also
 McAra (disambiguation)